"The More We Get Together" is a popular English children's song, originally written for a British charitable organisation for children, claimed authorship by Irving King in 1926, based on an old Viennese tune, "Oh du lieber Augustin".

Lyrics

Original
Oh, the more we are together,
Together, together,
Oh, the more we are together,
The merrier we'll be.
For your friends are my friends
And my friends are your friends.
So the more we are together,
The merrier we'll be.

Later
The more we get together,
Together, together,
The more we get together,
The happier we'll be.
For your friends are my friends
And my friends are your friends.
The more we get together,
The happier we'll be.

References

1926 songs